Frank Tayo Omiyale (born November 23, 1982) is a former American football offensive tackle who played in the National Football League. He was drafted by the Atlanta Falcons in the fifth round of the 2005 NFL Draft. He played college football at Tennessee Tech.

Omiyale also played for the Carolina Panthers, Chicago Bears, and the Seattle Seahawks.

Early years
Omiyale attended Whites Creek Comprehensive High School in Whites Creek, Tennessee. In football, he was twice voted as the team's Most Valuable Lineman, and won All-Region honors, and second-team All-State honors. He also lettered in basketball, and competed in shot put and discus on the track and field team.

College career
Omiyale played for Tennessee Tech for four years from 2001–2004. As a senior in 2004, he made the All-America team, won All-Ohio Valley Conference honors, and graded 90.5 for blocking consistency to lead the NCAA Division I-AA in that statistical category.

Omiyale was inducted into the Tennessee Tech Sports Hall of Fame in November 2015.

Professional career

Atlanta Falcons
Omiyale was selected in the fifth round (163rd overall) of the 2005 NFL Draft by the Atlanta Falcons.

As a rookie in 2005, Omiyale was inactive for all 16 regular season games for the Falcons. In 2006, he made his first NFL appearance for the Falcons in a game against the Pittsburgh Steelers on October 22, 2006. He was placed on waivers by the Falcons on September 1, 2007.

Carolina Panthers
On September 2, 2007, Omiyale was claimed off waivers by the Carolina Panthers. However, he was inactive for all 16 regular season games for the Panthers in 2007.

On October 5, 2008, Omiyale made his first NFL regular season start, replacing the injured left tackle Jordan Gross who was out with a concussion.

Chicago Bears
Omiyale signed a four-year, $14 million deal with the Chicago Bears on February 27, 2009. He was released by the team on March 1, 2012.

Seattle Seahawks
On March 21, 2012, the Seattle Seahawks announced that Omiyale had agreed to terms with the team. After spending the 2012 season in Seattle, Omiyale retired from the NFL.

References

External links

 Chicago Bears bio

1982 births
Living people
Players of American football from Nashville, Tennessee
American football offensive tackles
American football offensive guards
Tennessee Tech Golden Eagles football players
Atlanta Falcons players
Carolina Panthers players
Chicago Bears players
Seattle Seahawks players